Eccellenza Tuscany is the regional Eccellenza football division for clubs in Tuscany, Italy. It is competed amongst 37 teams, in three different groups (A, B and C). The winners of the Groups compete together in final round robin, and the first and second teams are promoted to Serie D. The club who finishes third, along with the second placed teams in the regular season, also have the chance to gain promotion, as they are entered into a national play-off which consists of two rounds.

Champions
Here are the past champions of the Tuscany Eccellenza, organised into their respective group.

Group A

1991–92 Livorno  	   	 	 	 	
1992–93 Sangiovannese
1993–94 Torrelaghese  	 	 	 	
1994–95 Viareggio 				
1995–96 Pietrasanta 				
1996–97 Venturina 				
1997–98 Cascina			
1998–99 Cerretese 
1999–2000 Larcianese 
2000–01 Cappiano Romaiano 1945 	
2001–02 Massese 							
2002–03 Armando Picchi				
2003–04 Cecina 				
2004–05 Pontedera 			
2005–06 Viareggio 				
2006–07 Gavorrano 
2007–08 Mobilieri Ponsacco	
2008–09 Rosignano
2009–10 Tuttocuoio	
2010–11 Pistoiese
2011–12 Lucca
2012–13 Jolly e Montemurlo
2013–14 Ponsacco
2014–15 Viareggio 2014
2015–16 Forte dei Marmi
2016–17 Seravezza
2017–18 Sangimignano
2018–19 Grosseto
2019–20 Pro Livorno Sorgenti
2020–21 Cascina
2021–22 Tau Altopascio

Group B

1993–94 Impruneta Tavarnuzze  	 	 	 	
1994–95 Virtus Chianciano 				
1995–96 Barberino M. 				
1996–97 Castelfiorentino 				
1997–98 Sangimignano 				
1998–99 Lanciotto Campi Bisenzio				
1999–2000 Fortis Juventus 
2000–01 Sansovino
2001–02 Chiusi 
2002–03 Calenzano 											
2003–04 Poggibonsi			
2004–05 Sangimignano 				
2005–06 Figline 				
2006–07 Colligiana
2007–08 Calenzano
2008–09 Monteriggioni
2009–10 Pianese
2010–11 Lanciotto
2011–12 FiesoleCaldine
2012–13 Olimpia Colligiana
2013–14 San Donato Tavarnelle
2014–15 Montecatini
2015–16 Rignanese
2016–17 Montevarchi Aquila
2017–18 Aglianese
2018–19 Grassina
2019–20 Badesse
2020–21 Poggibonsi
2021–22 Livorno

References

External links
Some Club Histories In the League

Sport in Tuscany
Tus
Sports leagues established in 1991
1991 establishments in Italy
Football clubs in Italy
Association football clubs established in 1991